Lindenberg is a German name meaning "Tilia tree" hill and may refer to:

 Lindenberg im Allgäu, a town in Bavaria, Germany
 Lindenberg, Mecklenburg-Vorpommern, a municipality in Mecklenburg-Vorpommern, Germany
 Lindenberg, Rhineland-Palatinate, a municipality in Rhineland-Palatinate, Germany
 Lindenberg (Habichtswald), a hill in Hesse, Germany
 Lindenberg (Switzerland), a mountain in the canton of Lucerne, Switzerland
 Governador Lindenberg, Espírito Santo, a municipality in Brazil
 , near Beeskow, Oder-Spree

Lindenberg is the surname of:

 Carl Lindenberg (1850–1928), judge and major stamp collector in Germany.
 Grzegorz Lindenberg (born 1955), Polish sociologist and journalist
 James Lindenberg (1921–2009), American actor
 Jarosław Lindenberg (born 1956), Polish philosopher, diplomat
 Katja Lindenberg (born 1941), Ecuadorian-American chemical physicist
 Udo Lindenberg (born 1946), German rock musician and composer

See also
 Lindberg (disambiguation)
 Lindeberg (disambiguation)
 Lindbergh (disambiguation)